The 1898 Wisconsin gubernatorial election was held on November 8, 1898.

Incumbent Republican Governor Edward Scofield defeated Democratic nominee Hiram Wilson Sawyer with 52.55% of the vote.

General election

Candidates
Major party candidates
Hiram Wilson Sawyer, Democratic, lawyer
Edward Scofield, Republican, incumbent Governor

Other candidates
Albinus A. Worsley, People's, farmer
Eugene W. Chafin, Prohibition, Prohibition nominee for Wisconsin's 2nd congressional district in 1882
Howard Tuttle, Social Democrat, scenic artist
Henry Riese, Socialist Labor, farmer

Results

References

Bibliography
 
 
 

1898
Wisconsin
Gubernatorial